Benjamin or Ben Henley may refer to: 

Ben C. Henley (1907–1987), American lawyer and businessman from Arkansas
Benjamin Franklin Henley, for whom the Benjamin Franklin Henley House in Searcy County, Arkansas is named